There are thirteen constituencies in Finland, nowadays called electoral districts by the Finnish Parliament. (The English word "constituency" is confusing due to its various meanings.) The citizens of each electoral district elect from 6 to 35 MPs (members of parliament), depending on the population of the district, but 05 Åland only elects one. The boundaries of the electoral districts are based on the province division in use from 1634 to 1997 and has remained basically the same since the first parliamentary election in 1907. In 1939, the constituency of Northern Oulu was divided between the constituencies of Lapland and Oulu. The constituency of Southern Oulu was renamed to Oulu in the process. After the Continuation War, the electoral districts of Eastern and Western Viipuri, which lost much of their territories to the Soviet Union, were united to the new constituency of Kymi. At the same time, Åland became a distinct constituency. In 1954, Helsinki was cut from the constituency of Uusimaa. In 1962, the southern and northern Vaasa constituencies were united. In 2015, the constituencies of Kymi and Southern Savonia were united, forming the constituency of South-Eastern Finland; similarly, the constituencies of Northern Savonia and North Karelia were united to form the constituency of Savonia-Karelia.

Constituencies 
The number of seats per constituency are based on the 2015 parliamentary election.

References

External links 
Vaalipiirit at the Finnish Ministry of Justice.

 
Finland
Finland politics-related lists